Tom Radulski (born July 24, 1955) is an American football coach and former player.  He was the second head football coach at Sacred Heart University, serving from 1997 until he was fired midway thought the 1999 season, and compiling a record of 4–22. Radulski's first season was also the Pioneers' first in NCAA Division I-AA competition. In 1999, the Pioneers left the Eastern Football Conference to join the Northeast Conference.

Radulski had previously been the first head coach in the University of Massachusetts Lowell's football program's history from 1993 to 1995. He was an assistant coach at Colby College, the University of New Hampshire, Columbia University, Hamilton College, College of the Holy Cross, and Allegheny College.

Head coaching record

College

Notes

References

External links
 Holy Cross Crusaders bio
 Bates Bobcats bio

1955 births
Living people
Allegheny Gators football coaches
Bowdoin Polar Bears football coaches
Colby Mules football coaches
Columbia Lions football coaches
Hamilton Continentals football coaches
Holy Cross Crusaders football coaches
New Hampshire Wildcats football coaches
New Hampshire Wildcats football players
Sacred Heart Pioneers football coaches
UMass Lowell River Hawks football coaches
Bates Bobcats football coaches
High school football coaches in Maine